Jur may refer to:
 Jur, Iran, a village in Isfahan Province, Iran
 Jur River, in Africa
 Jur language (ISO 639-3: lwo), spoken in South Sudan
 Jurien Bay Airport, in Australia
 Jurong East MRT station (MRT station abbreviation), in Jurong East, Singapore
 Jurúna language (ISO 639-3: jur), spoken in Brazil

People 
 Jur Hronec (1881–1959), Slovak mathematician
 Jur Vrieling (born 1969), Dutch show jumping rider
 Barthélemy de Jur (–1158), French bishop